Nespolo is a surname. Notable people with the surname include:

Carla Federica Nespolo (1943–2020), Italian politician
Matías Néspolo (born 1975), Argentine writer and journalist
Ugo Nespolo (born 1941), Italian painter and sculptor